The Second Hodgman Ministry was a ministry of the Government of Tasmania, led by Will Hodgman of the Tasmanian Liberals. It was formed on 21 March 2018, after the previous government was re-elected at the 2018 Tasmanian state election.

All members of the ministry, aside from Courtney and Jaensch, previously served in the First Hodgman Ministry.

References

External links
 The Ministry, Parliament of Tasmania

Tasmanian ministries